Texhoma is a town in Texas County, Oklahoma, United States.  The population was 856 at the 2020 census.  Texhoma is a divided city with the Texas–Oklahoma state border separating the town from Texhoma, Texas. The name of the town is a portmanteau of Texas and Oklahoma.  Founded around the Rock Island Railroad laying tracks through the area, much of the town's local economy is from ranching and livestock.

History
Before No Man's Land was opened for settlers in 1890, the area now known as the Oklahoma Panhandle was sparsely settled ranchland. After the opening, filing occurred on some of the land near the CCC Ranch, mostly by the cowboys, and sold to the ranch as soon as proved up. Expansion of the Rock Island Railroad tracks from Liberal, Kansas to Santa Rosa, New Mexico spurred the settlement's formation.

A post office named Loretta was established May 7, 1898, but anticipating the railroad, the post office in 1901 moved and changed its name to Texhoma, said name referring to the community's location on the state line.  Very few claims were filed on until the railroad was assured. The town grew quickly to a population near 1,000, serving as the closest railroad town to the people who lived as far north and west as present Boise City, and south into the Texas Panhandle to the present town of Gruver.

The land was quickly homesteaded and proved to be a rich agricultural area.

Geography
Texhoma is located at  (36.504421, -101.786517).

Texhoma-Texhoma relationship
Texhoma is most known for the fact that it is paired with another Texhoma across the border in Texas. Tourists come for the border sign that separates Oklahoma and Texas, and the sign is very iconic.

Demographics

As of the census of 2000, there were 935 people, 352 households, and 254 families residing in the town. There were 408 housing units at an average density of 652.3 per square mile (250.0/km2). The racial makeup of the town was 81.60% White, 0.96% Native American, 0.21% Asian, 14.76% from other races, and 2.46% from two or more races. Hispanic or Latino of any race were 31.76% of the population.

There were 352 households, out of which 39.2% had children under the age of 18 living with them, 60.5% were married couples living together, 5.7% had a female householder with no husband present, and 27.8% were non-families. 25.0% of all households were made up of individuals, and 13.1% had someone living alone who was 65 years of age or older. The average household size was 2.66 and the average family size was 3.15.

In the town, the population was spread out, with 31.2% under the age of 18, 9.1% from 18 to 24, 27.6% from 25 to 44, 18.6% from 45 to 64, and 13.5% who were 65 years of age or older. The median age was 32 years. For every 100 females, there were 113.0 males. For every 100 females age 18 and over, there were 103.5 males.

The median income for a household in the town was $27,500, and the median income for a family was $36,667. Males had a median income of $23,229 versus $18,250 for females. The per capita income for the town was $12,938. About 11.7% of families and 15.8% of the population were below the poverty line, including 16.9% of those under age 18 and 17.8% of those age 65 or over.

Education
Texhoma students in both Texas and Oklahoma are served jointly by an unusual bi-state arrangement.  Kindergarten through fourth grade students are served by the Texhoma Independent School District  in Texas, while fifth through twelfth grade students by Texhoma Public Schools in Oklahoma.  It is the only city in Oklahoma where graduating students can attend either Oklahoma or Texas public universities at the in-state tuition rates for either.

Transportation
The town is served by State Highway 95, which runs from a southern terminus at the Texas state line 42.5 miles north to the Kansas state line, as well as by U.S. Highway 54.

Texhoma Municipal Airport (FAA  ID: K49) is closed indefinitely; however, Guymon Municipal Airport (KGUY; FAA ID: GUY) is approximately 22 miles northeast.

Commercial air transportation is available at Liberal Mid-America Regional Airport in Liberal, Kansas, about 62 miles northeast,  or at the larger Rick Husband Amarillo International Airport, about 110 miles to the south.

Sites of interest
Texhoma High School is housed in a pair of monolithic dome structures.

NRHP-listed locations in the Texhoma area are: 
 CCC (Three C) Ranch Headquarters (Osborn Homestead) (west of Texhoma)
 Penick House (218 N. East St.)
 Johnson-Cline Archaeological Site

Notable person
Patience Latting, Oklahoma City mayor, 1971–1983

References

External links
 
 

Towns in Texas County, Oklahoma
Towns in Oklahoma
Divided cities
Twin cities
Oklahoma Panhandle